Lauaru Nature Reserve is a nature reserve which is located in Pärnu County, Estonia.

The area of the nature reserve is 88 ha.

The protected area was founded in 1991 to protect Koonga Oak Forest.

References

Nature reserves in Estonia
Geography of Pärnu County